Assio is a small town in the Bagassi Department of Balé Province in southern Burkina Faso. The town has a population of 1106.

Nearby towns and villages include Ouahabou (2.2 nm) and Pâ (9.8 nm).

References

External links
Satellite map at Maplandia.com

Populated places in the Boucle du Mouhoun Region
Balé Province